Fan Xiaodong (born on March 2, 1987) is a Chinese professional footballer who currently plays for China League One club Zibo Cuju as a midfielder or left-back.

Club career

Shenzhen Jianlibao
Fan Xiaodong started his professional football career when he joined Chinese Super League team Shenzhen Jianlibao in the 2005 league season. He would have to wait until the 2006 league season before he would make his league debut against Inter Xian on July 12, 2006, in a 2–2 draw, coming on as a second-half substitute. Gradually establishing himself throughout the season he would eventually play in 4 league games for Shenzhen, however it was in the 2007 Chinese Super League season that Fan Xiaodong establish himself as prominent member of the Shenzhen team by playing in 21 league games and help them avoid relegation. Being one of the few bright aspects in what was a disappointing season for Shenzhen, Fan Xiaodong was allowed to continue and  develop for Shenzhen in the following season by playing in a further 21 league games whilst also scoring his first goal against Changchun Yatai on November 2, 2008, in a 4–2 defeat.

Hangzhou Greentown
Fan Xiaodong joined Hangzhou Greentown together with Zhang Ye at the beginning of the 2009 Chinese Super League season. He would make his debut against Qingdao Jonoon on March 22, 2009, in a 2–1 win in Hangzhou's first game of the season. Throughout the season Fan would be used as a squad player as the club struggled within the league and finished within the relegation zone, however they were given a reprieve along with Chongqing Lifan after it was discovered that Chengdu Blades and Guangzhou F.C. had fixed matches and were relegated instead as punishment. Fan would soon gain more playing time and score his first goal for his club on April 10, 2010, in a league game against Shanghai Shenhua where Hangzhou lost 2–1. By the end of the season Hangzhou came fourth within the league and qualified for the 2011 AFC Champions League for the first time where he played in all six games as they were knocked out in the group stages.

Changchun Yatai
On 5 January 2016, Fan moved to Chinese Super League side Changchun Yatai on a five-year contract. He made his debut for Changchun on 6 March 2016 in the first league match of the season against his former club Hangzhou Greentown. He scored his first goal for Changchun on 16 September 2016 in a 3–1 victory against Guangzhou R&F. Fan scored another goal on 16 October 2016 in a 2–1 win against Beijing Guoan. He scored two goals in all thirty matches in the 2016 season and secured Changchun's stay in the top flight for the next season.

International career
On 10 January 2017, Fan made his debut for Chinese national team in the 2017 China Cup against Iceland. He scored his first international goal on 26 March 2018 in a 4–1 loss against Czech Republic in the third place match of 2018 China Cup.

Career statistics

Club statistics 
Statistics accurate as of match played 31 December 2020.

International statistics

International goals
Scores and results list China's goal tally first.

References

External links
 
 
Player stats at sohu.com

1987 births
Living people
Sportspeople from Zibo
Chinese footballers
Footballers from Shandong
Shenzhen F.C. players
Zhejiang Professional F.C. players
Changchun Yatai F.C. players
Chinese Super League players
China international footballers
Association football midfielders